Creekside is a home rule-class city in Jefferson County, Kentucky, United States. The population was 305 at the 2010 census.

Geography
Creekside is located in northeastern Jefferson County at  (38.292179, -85.568122). It is bordered to the south by Hickory Hill and on all other sides by the Louisville/Jefferson County Metro Government.

Demographics

As of the census of 2000, there were 336 people, 124 households, and 106 families residing in the city. The racial makeup of the city was 94.35% White, 3.57% Black or African American, 0.89% from other races, and 1.19% from two or more races. Hispanic or Latino of any race were 0.60% of the population.

There were 124 households, out of which 36.3% had children under the age of 18 living with them, 78.2% were married couples living together, 4.0% had a female householder with no husband present, and 14.5% were non-families. 13.7% of all households were made up of individuals, and 4.8% had someone living alone who was 65 years of age or older. The average household size was 2.71 and the average family size was 2.97.

In the city, the population was spread out, with 24.7% under the age of 18, 3.6% from 18 to 24, 28.3% from 25 to 44, 32.1% from 45 to 64, and 11.3% who were 65 years of age or older. The median age was 42 years. For every 100 females, there were 93.1 males. For every 100 females age 18 and over, there were 94.6 males.

The median income for a household in the city was $77,385, and the median income for a family was $85,000. Males had a median income of $60,750 versus $29,375 for females. The per capita income for the city was $31,457. About 1.0% of families and 3.4% of the population were below the poverty line, including 5.1% of those under age 18 and none of those age 65 or over.

Creekside City is the first city in the USA and new Europe, which has nominated and then elected its first immigrant, Indian mayor  in US-Europe History. (RUN DATE:11/06/18)

References

External links
 City of Creekside official website
 City of Creekside information from the Kentucky Secretary of State
 City of Creekside interactive map from the Kentucky Secretary of State

Cities in Jefferson County, Kentucky
Cities in Kentucky